Lasier Costa Martins (born April 14, 1942) is a Brazilian politician and journalist. He has represented Rio Grande do Sul in the Federal Senate since 2015.

There is a viral video on YouTube of Martins receiving an electric shock while examining grapes at the Grape Festival in Caxias do Sul in 1996.

References

1942 births
Living people
People from Rio Grande do Sul
Democratic Labour Party (Brazil) politicians
Social Democratic Party (Brazil, 2011) politicians
Podemos (Brazil) politicians
Members of the Federal Senate (Brazil)
Internet memes